Felbrigg is a village in England.

Felbrigg may also refer to:

Thomas Wyndham of Felbrigg, a see captain
John Felbrigg, MP for Ipswich (UK Parliament constituency)